Springtime is a Silly Symphonies animated Disney short film. It was released in 1929. It was the third Silly Symphonies film to be produced, just five days before the 1929 Stock Market Crash.

Plot
Flowers, ladybugs, centipedes, birds, and frogs dance (and devour each other) in time to the usual blend of themes from the light classics.

The music used in the film includes "Morning Mood" from Edvard Grieg's Peer Gynt, Franz von Blon's "Whispering Flowers", Amilcare Ponchielli's music for "Dance of the Hours" and Jacques Offenbach's "Gaîté Parisienne".

Reception
Motion Picture News (November 2, 1929): "A Panic. Another contribution to the entertainment of the nation. Walt Disney has been hitting an extremely high average with his various cartoon series. This one is well worth whatever praise this reporter may bestow upon it. The basis of the amusing antics is the line which ruminates about springtime, love and levity. Everything turns terpsichore: flowers, spiders, cranes, frogs. The routines they pass through are guaranteed to make any audience laugh."

The Film Daily (November 3, 1929): "This is called a Disney Silly Symphony, and it is a corker. The cartoon work is about the best that has ever been seen in the animated field, the expressions and general antics of the animals being unusually clever as well as true to life. A series of frogs graduating in size are swallowed by each other in turn, till only the last big frog is left. This one in turn is swallowed by a long-legged bird, who is so weighted down that he flops in a pond and is drowned. The clever conceit is a fine satire on the survival of the fittest in the animal world. The synchronized music accompanying the dancing music of the frogs adds greatly to the laughs, which come easily."

Variety (February 12, 1930): "Another amusing, ingeniously made cartoon comedy drawn by Walt Disney. Oke for any theatre. In Springtime Disney has sought to express that vernal feeling of animated insect, animal and flower characters in novel dance routines set to intriguing musical numbers. Timing of the dances, the accompanying taps, etc., is so perfect that the rhythm alone imparts rare entertainment value to this new one in the Silly Symphony series. Every opportunity to inject comedy for laughs has also been seized. Some repetition in the nature of the dance routines but not serious."

Home media
The short was released on December 19, 2006, on Walt Disney Treasures: More Silly Symphonies, Volume Two.

In popular culture
The cartoon also makes an appearance in the 1961 animated  film One Hundred and One Dalmatians (also made by Disney), when the puppies are watching TV with Horace and Jasper.

Similarly, one of the music piece from the latter half of the short would later be reused for the full "Dance of the Hours" segment in Walt Disney's 1940 film, Fantasia.

References

External links
 

1929 films
1929 short films
1929 animated films
1920s Disney animated short films
Silly Symphonies
Films directed by Walt Disney
Films produced by Walt Disney
American black-and-white films
Animated films without speech
Columbia Pictures animated short films
Columbia Pictures short films
1920s American films